Maailma tarvitsee sankareita is the fourth studio album by the Finnish heavy metal band Teräsbetoni.

Track listing

Personnel
Jarkko Ahola - lead vocals, bass
Arto Järvinen: guitar, vocals
Viljo Rantanen: guitar
Jari Kuokkanen: drums

References

2010 albums
Teräsbetoni albums